The Illinois Labor History Society is a nonprofit educational organization founded in 1969. It is a voluntary organization composed of academics, unionists, and persons interested in labor history. It was formed "To encourage the preservation and study of labor history in the Illinois region, and to arouse public interest in the profound significance of the past to the present."

Since the 1970s, the Society has held the deed to the Haymarket Martyrs' Monument, and been responsible for its maintenance and restoration.

See also
 List of historical sites related to the Illinois labor movement

External links
 The organization's website

1969 establishments in Illinois
Non-profit organizations based in Chicago